Magnesium levulinate, the magnesium salt of levulinic acid,  is a mineral supplement.

External links
 

Magnesium compounds
Salts of carboxylic acids